Arik Mark Levinson is a professor of economics at Georgetown University. He is known for his research in the fields of energy economics and environmental economics. He was a senior economist at the Council of Economic Advisers in the Obama administration from 2010 to 2011.

Education
Levinson received his A.B. from Harvard University in 1986 and his Ph.D. from Columbia University in 1993.

References

External links

Arik Levinson home page.

Living people
Georgetown University faculty
21st-century American economists
Energy economists
Environmental economists
Harvard University alumni
Columbia Graduate School of Arts and Sciences alumni
Year of birth missing (living people)